Veerle Baetens (born 24 January 1978) is a Belgian actress and singer probably best known for her role as Elise/Alabama in The Broken Circle Breakdown and as lead detective Hannah Maes in the crime drama Code 37. She has also starred in numerous Flemish movies.

Early life 
Baetens was born in Brasschaat, Belgium.  She had a musical education at the Hoger Instituut voor Dramatische Kunsten in Brussels.

Career 
In 2005, she won the "John Kraaijkamp Musical Award", in the category of 'Leading Actress in a musical', for the title role in the Dutch musical adaptation of Pippi Longstocking.

In 2008, she won the Flemish TV-star Award (Flemish equivalent of the Emmy Award) for Best Actress and Most Popular TV Personality, both for the title role in Sara.

In 2012, she released an album with her band "Dallas", called Take it all.

In 2013, she won the "best actress" category at the European Film Awards for her role in The Broken Circle Breakdown.

In 2013 she portrayed Margaret of Anjou in the Starz miniseries The White Queen, based on the novel of the same name by Philippa Gregory.

Filmography

Musicals
Cabaret (1998)
Where were you when... (1999)
Nonsens (1999)
Chicago (2000)
Holiday Love Show (2003)
Pippi Langkous (2005) – Pippi Langkous

Awards as film actress

References

External links
 
 

1978 births
Living people
21st-century Belgian actresses
21st-century Flemish actresses
European Film Award for Best Actress winners
Flemish film actresses
Flemish musical theatre actresses
Flemish television actresses
Magritte Award winners
People from Brasschaat